In the field of topology, the signature is an integer invariant which is defined for an oriented manifold M of dimension divisible by four.

This invariant of a manifold has been studied in detail, starting with  Rokhlin's theorem for 4-manifolds, and Hirzebruch signature theorem.

Definition 
Given a connected and oriented manifold M of dimension 4k, the cup product gives rise to a quadratic form Q on the 'middle' real cohomology group

.

The basic identity for the cup product

shows that with p = q = 2k the product is symmetric. It takes values in

.

If we assume also that M is compact, Poincaré duality identifies this with

Therefore the cup product, under these hypotheses, does give rise to a symmetric bilinear form on H2k(M,R); and therefore to a quadratic form Q. The form Q is non-degenerate due to Poincaré duality, as it pairs non-degenerately with itself. More generally, the signature can be defined in this way for any general compact polyhedron with 4n-dimensional Poincaré duality.

The signature of M is by definition the signature of Q, an ordered triple according to its definition. If M is not connected, its signature is defined to be the sum of the signatures of its connected components.

Other dimensions 

If M has dimension not divisible by 4, its signature is usually defined to be 0. There are alternative generalization in L-theory: the signature can be interpreted as the 4k-dimensional (simply connected) symmetric L-group  or as the 4k-dimensional quadratic L-group  and these invariants do not always vanish for other dimensions. The Kervaire invariant is a mod 2 (i.e., an element of ) for framed manifolds of dimension 4k+2 (the quadratic L-group ), while the de Rham invariant is a mod 2 invariant of manifolds of dimension 4k+1 (the symmetric L-group ); the other dimensional L-groups vanish.

Kervaire invariant 

When  is twice an odd integer (singly even), the same construction gives rise to an antisymmetric bilinear form. Such forms do not have a signature invariant; if they are non-degenerate, any two such forms are equivalent. However, if one takes a quadratic refinement of the form, which occurs if one has a framed manifold, then the resulting ε-quadratic forms need not be equivalent, being distinguished by the Arf invariant. The resulting invariant of a manifold is called the Kervaire invariant.

Properties 
René Thom (1954) showed that the signature of a manifold is a cobordism invariant, and in particular is given by some linear combination of its Pontryagin numbers. Friedrich Hirzebruch (1954) found an explicit expression for this linear combination as the L genus of the manifold. William Browder (1962) proved that a simply connected compact polyhedron with 4n-dimensional Poincaré duality is homotopy equivalent to a manifold if and only if its signature satisfies the expression of the Hirzebruch signature theorem. Rokhlin's theorem says that the signature of a 4-dimensional simply connected manifold with a spin structure is divisible by 16.

See also
Hirzebruch signature theorem
Genus of a multiplicative sequence
Rokhlin's theorem

References

Geometric topology
Quadratic forms